The Leapmotor C01 is a battery electric compact executive sedan produced by Chinese automobile manufacturer Leapmotor. It is the second product of the updated design language of the Leapmotor brand.

Overview

The Leapmotor C01 is built on the same platform as the Leapmotor C11 crossover SUV and has a drag coefficient of 0.226Cd. The entry level C01 has a single motor capable of 200 kW (268 hp) and a peak torque of 360 Nm, while the dual-motor version has a max power output of 400 kW (536 hp) and peak torque of 720 Nm. All C01 models are equipped with a ternary battery with CTC technology that allows a battery tray with a battery module and body to be integrated into production vehicle bodies.

The ultra-long range version of the C01 has a 90 kWh battery pack supporting a CLTC range of 717 kilometers (445 miles), while the base version comes with a  500 km (310 mile) range. The top of the trim C01 Pro+ performance version can accelerate from 0 to 100 km/h within 3.7 seconds.

The interior of the C01 shares the T-type triple-screen design with the Leapmotor C11. The center screen is equipped with a built-in Qualcomm SA 8155P chip and measures 12.8 inches, while the instrumental screen and additional screens measure 10.25 inches.

References

Cars introduced in 2022
Electric car models
C01
Rear-wheel-drive vehicles
All-wheel-drive vehicles
Sports sedans
Production electric cars
Executive cars
Cars of China
2020s cars